Pseudopyrausta acutangulalis is a moth of the family Crambidae described by Pieter Cornelius Tobias Snellen in 1875. It is native to South America, Central America and the Antilles. It has been introduced to Hawaii to control species of the genus Lantana.

The larvae feed on Lantana camara.

External links
Moths of Jamaica
Moths of Belize

Moths described in 1875
Pyraustinae